Ḥaydan District is a district of the Sa'dah Governorate, Yemen. As of 2003, the district had a population of 60,331 inhabitants.

Access is had by travelling overland by four-wheel-drive vehicle and takes more than an hour to reach from Sa'dah because of the high and treacherous terrain. It was once home to a large Jewish community who have since settled in the land of Israel.

References

Districts of Saada Governorate
Saada Governorate